Lihini Aluwihare is a Sri Lankan Marine chemist, and oceanographer. She teaches at Scripps Institution of Oceanography.

Life 
She graduated from Mount Holyoke College, and Massachusetts Institute of Technology.

She studied the chemistry of coral reefs. She studied tarballs from an oil pipeline spill.

She studied the discovered DDT dump sites, off the coast of California.

Works

References 

Oceanographers
Scripps Institution of Oceanography faculty

Living people
Year of birth missing (living people)
Sri Lankan women scientists
Massachusetts Institute of Technology alumni
Mount Holyoke College alumni
Women oceanographers